The Baojun RS-3 is a subcompact crossover SUV produced by SAIC-GM-Wuling through the Baojun brand.

Overview

The Baojun RS-3 is the successor of Baojun 510, while the 510 continued to be sold alongside the RS-3. As the car sports the new Baojun nomenclature, design language and new Baojun logo, it is marketed under the 'New Baojun' subcategory.

The car was revealed in September 2019, featuring the Interstellar Geometry design language of the brand. and was available across China in October 2019.

The Baojun RS-3 is available in four trim levels in China, with prices ranging between RMB 71,800 and RMB 89,800 ($10,160-$12,710). Interior technologies of the RS-3 include Baojun's connectivity system that integrates mobile connectivity, an advanced voice recognition system, and over-the-air software upgrades. The RS-3 also features an additional Bosch-supplied Level 2 advanced adaptive cruise control system that can be activated at speeds under .

Sales

References 

RS-3
Cars introduced in 2019
SAIC-GM-Wuling
Cars of China
Front-wheel-drive vehicles
Mini sport utility vehicles

Vehicles with CVT transmission